Manchester Association F.C. was an English association football club from Eccles, founded in 1875 in order to revive the association game in Manchester.

History

The instigator of the club was a former Nottingham Forest player, Fitzroy Norris, and the new club included a number of men who had been active with the former Hulme Athenaeum club.  The first practice session took place in November 1875 and its first match was against students at Liverpool University in January 1876.

The club first entered the FA Cup in 1877, losing at Darwen by a score of 3-0 or 4-1; Manchester had started the match with only nine men, and two goals in the match were disputed, but, given the result was not in doubt, the clubs did not submit a request to the Football Association for arbitration.

Manchester Wanderers

In October 1878, Birch F.C. split its footballing section from its rugby football section, which started playing under the name Manchester Wanderers at Brooks Bar in Whalley Range.

In 1879, Association and Wanderers merged, playing under the Manchester Wanderers name at Brooks Bar until 1882, when the club reverted back to Manchester Association.

Post-merger

In 1883, the club beat Stoke in the first round of the FA Cup, thanks to an early example of man-marking; full-back Walker and half-back Sumner "appearing to have received special instructions to look after" the Stoke forward Ted Wilson, who had starred for Cambridge University, and the two centre-forwards Newby and Bassett "had orders to keep Johnson [Stoke centre-forward] as quiet as possible". In the second round, Manchester became the first English club to play a Cup tie in Scotland, when drawn away to Queen's Park.  However, in front of nearly 3,000 spectators, the club went down to a 15-0 defeat, seven goals coming in the first half-an-hour.  McCallum in the Queen's Park goal did not touch the ball with his hands; nevertheless the teams dined together after the match.  It was the club's last FA Cup appearance.

The club was a founder member of the Manchester Football Association and reached the final of the Manchester Cup in 1886, losing to Newton Heath L&YR.  It entered the competition in 1887 but an 11-0 home defeat to Blackburn Rovers in the first round of the Lancashire Senior Cup in October 1887, despite a large number of spectators, seems to have acted as a death-knell to the club, as there are no further records for the club for the next season.

Colours

The club's original colours were scarlet and black hoops, bought from a Deansgate outfitter.   By 1876 they had changed to blue and French grey "harlequin" pattern (quarters) shirts, with white shorts and blue stockings.  In 1880, when playing under the name Manchester Wanderers, the club wore white, but by 1887 at the latest the club was wearing blue and white quartered shirts and white shorts.

References

Football clubs in Manchester
Defunct football clubs in England
Defunct football clubs in Greater Manchester
Association football clubs disestablished in the 19th century
Association football clubs established in 1875